Daniel Johannes "Duane" Vermeulen (born 3 July 1986) is a South African professional rugby union player who currently plays for the South Africa national team and Ulster Rugby in the United Rugby Championship, he previously played for the Vodacom Blue Bulls and the,  and in South African domestic rugby, the ,  and  in Super Rugby and  in the Top 14. He was an instrumental part of South Africa winning the 2019 Rugby World Cup and received the Man of the Match award in the final.
Vermeulen plays as a Number eight but he is equally adept at playing both blindside and openside flanker.

Club career
Vermeulen began his career in the Free State, playing for the Free State Cheetahs in the Currie Cup and the Cheetahs in the Super 14. He eventually followed his former coach Rassie Erasmus and joined the much larger and more competitive Western Province rugby union in 2009 after three seasons with the Free State.
He put in some strong displays for the Stormers in the 2010 Super 14 season, where the Stormers made it all the way to the final.

Injuries plagued Vermeulen's 2011 and early 2012 seasons, however, after playing just nine games of Super Rugby, was selected as part of Heyneke Meyer's squad for the away leg of the Rugby Championship.

Vermeulen has twice won the Currie Cup, in 2007 with the Free State and in 2012 with Western Province. He was named captain of the Stormers for the 2015 Super Rugby season. Whilst out with a neck injury, in June 2015 Vermeulen flew to France to be unveiled as a post-2015 Rugby World Cup signing for Top 14 club Toulon.

After a short spell in Japan with Kubota Spears, Vermeulen travelled back to his home nation of South Africa as a -player, signing in October 2018.

On 16 September 2021, it was announced that Vermeulen would join Irish province Ulster in the United Rugby Championship for the 2021-22 season. Vermeulen made his Ulster debut on 11 December 2021 in the European Rugby Champions Cup, against Clermont Auvergne.

International career
Before his first full international cap, Vermeulen represented South Africa at the second level of international rugby, appearing for the Emerging Springboks. One highlight of his appearances for the Emerging Boks was being in the squad that performed against the British & Irish Lions, holding them to a 13–13 draw, during their tour to South Africa in 2009.

Vermeulen looked like being a certain selection for the Springboks, Vermeulen was not called into the Springbok squad that faced Wales, Italy and France. He was also omitted from the Springboks 2010 Tri Nations Series squad.
After a stand out Currie Cup domestic Rugby Season, Vermeulen was named as part of the 39-man preliminary training squad ahead of the 2010 end of year grand slam tour to the Northern Hemisphere. He was once again overlooked for selection in the final squad.

Vermeulen made his international debut for South Africa on 8 September 2012, where he formed part of the starting lineup going up against Australia. He was selected again to start the following week against New Zealand in Dunedin, where South Africa lost by 10 points. On 29 September 2012, South Africa beat Australia 31–8, a victory which marked Vermeulen's first Springbok win.

He was selected for the Springboks' 2012 Northern Hemisphere tour. Vermeulen received a man of the match award for his performance against England at Twickenham during this tour, based on a number of vital turnovers on the ground, 15 hard tackles, and his role of primary ball carrier on the day. In 2014, he was one of five nominees for the IRB Player of the Year award.

Vermeulen played in the 2019 Rugby World Cup Final against England. He was part of the South African team that won their third World Cup at the Yokohama Stadium in Japan. He was awarded a man of the match award for his performance where he made a number of vital contributions, including 10 carries, making 49 meters (both the most in the match) and 2 turnovers.

Honours
 SARU Rugby Player of the Year 2014
 Super Rugby Player of Year 2014
 Super Rugby and Unlocked Player of Year 2020 
 SA Rugby Player of the Year for 2020 
 Currie Cup winner 2020–21

Test Match Record

Pld = Games Played, W = Games Won, D = Games Drawn, L = Games Lost, Tri = Tries Scored, Pts = Points Scored

International Tries

Super Rugby Statistics

References

External links

Ulster Rugby profile
United Rugby Championship profile

Stormers profile
WP rugby profile
itsrugby profile

1986 births
Living people
People from Mbombela
South African rugby union players
South Africa international rugby union players
Stormers players
Western Province (rugby union) players
Cheetahs (rugby union) players
Free State Cheetahs players
Pumas (Currie Cup) players
Rugby union flankers
Rugby union number eights
White South African people
RC Toulonnais players
Kubota Spears Funabashi Tokyo Bay players
Bulls (rugby union) players
Blue Bulls players
Ulster Rugby players
Rugby union players from Mpumalanga
South African expatriate rugby union players
South African expatriate sportspeople in Japan
South African expatriate sportspeople in Northern Ireland
South African expatriate sportspeople in France
Expatriate rugby union players in France
Expatriate rugby union players in Japan
Expatriate rugby union players in Northern Ireland